Subhash Piraji Sabne is a Bharatiya Janata Party politician from Nanded district, Marathwada. He was a member of the 13th Maharashtra Legislative Assembly. He represented the Deglur Assembly Constituency as member of Shiv Sena. He had formerly represented the Mukhed constituency as a Shiv Sena member during the period 1999-2009. In July, 2015, he was a member of the Maharashtra State Legislature Scheduled Caste Welfare Committee.

Controversy
Sabne was reported to have been involved in holding up a train at Hazur Sahib Nanded railway station because his reservation wasn't confirmed.

Positions held
 1999: Elected to Maharashtra Legislative Assembly
 2004: Re-elected to Maharashtra Legislative Assembly
 2014: Re-elected to Maharashtra Legislative Assembly

References

External links
 Shivsena Home Page

Maharashtra MLAs 2014–2019
Living people
Shiv Sena politicians
People from Nanded district
Marathi politicians
Year of birth missing (living people)